John Buchanan (13 October 1819 – 1898) was a New Zealand botanist and scientific artist. He was a fellow of the Linnean Society.

Biography 

Buchanan was born in Dunbartonshire, Scotland, and in his early life apprenticed as a calico pattern designer. He emigrated to Dunedin in 1852, not long after the settlement had been established, working as a survey assistant and gold prospector, during the Otago Gold Rush. During this period, Buchanan was an amateur botanist, collecting plant specimens he sent to contacts in Scotland. On the recommendation of Joseph Dalton Hooker, Buchanan became employed as a botanist for James Hector's survey of Otago and the West Coast of the South Island.

In 1865, Buchanan was employed by the Colonial Museum in Wellington (now Museum of New Zealand Te Papa Tongarewa), after Hector was appointed as the director of the institution. During the next 20 years, Buchanan collected specimens for the museum and surveyed the plants growing in the Wellington Botanic Garden.

Works
 Botanical notes on the Kaikoura Mountains and Mount Egmont (1867)
 Manual of the indigenous grasses of New Zealand (1880)

Buchanan also had some 29 publications in the Transactions and Proceedings of the Royal Society of New Zealand, including his identification of new species.

Artworks
 Contributed woodcuts to Buller's Manual of New Zealand Birds
 Contributed scientific illustrations to Hutton's Fishes of New Zealand

References

External links

 National Library of New Zealand
 Artworks in the collection of Museum of New Zealand Te Papa Tongarewa

1819 births
1898 deaths
19th-century New Zealand botanists
New Zealand naturalists
People from Dunbartonshire
Scottish emigrants to New Zealand